The National Trust for the Cayman Islands is the national trust serving the Cayman Islands. Its purposes are to preserve sites of artistic and architectural interest in the islands and to provide protection for local natural resources and wildlife. It also oversees a program in which sites of special historic interest are marked with a plaque noting their importance.

Projects

Grand Cayman
 Bodden Town Guardhouse Park
 Dr. Roy's Ironshore Historic Site 
East End Light House Park
Fort George
Governor Michael Gore Bird Sanctuary
Heritage Beach 
Old Savannah School House
Watler Cemetery
Mastic Reserve and Trail
Bodden Town Mission House, Grand Cayman
Queen Elizabeth II Botanic Park
 home of Nurse Leila Yates, the only original wattle and daub house in the Trust's care

Cayman Brac
Cayman Brac Parrot Reserve
The Splits, Cayman Brac
Spellman McLaughlin Home
Eldemire House

Little Cayman
 Booby Pond Nature Reserve
 National Trust Visitors Centre of Little Cayman

References

Caymanian National Trust website
Official Cayman Islands Tourism Website

Cayman Islands
Cultural organisations based in the Cayman Islands
Charities based in the Cayman Islands
Tourism in the Cayman Islands
Nature conservation in the Cayman Islands
Year of establishment missing
History of the Cayman Islands